Eriochloa polystachya is a species of grass known by the common name Caribbean cupgrass. It is native to the West Indies, Costa Rica, Honduras, South America, Florida and Texas.

References

External links
USDA Plants Profile

Panicoideae